Butler Township is one of sixteen townships in Butler County, Iowa, USA.  As of the 2020 census, its population was 1,567.

Geography
According to the USGS, it contains four cemeteries: Antioch, Lowell, Old and Old Town.

References

External links
 US-Counties.com
 City-Data.com

Townships in Butler County, Iowa
Townships in Iowa